Savanes Region is a defunct region of Ivory Coast. From 1997 to 2011, it was a first-level subdivision region. The region's capital was Korhogo and its area was 40,210 km². Since 2011, the area formerly encompassed by the region is co-extensive with Savanes District.

Administrative divisions
At the time of its dissolution, Savanes Region was divided into seven departments: Boundiali, Ferkessédougou, Korhogo, Kouto, Ouangolodougou, Sinématiali, and Tengréla.

Abolition
Savanes Region was abolished as part of the 2011 administrative reorganisation of the subdivisions of Ivory Coast. The area formerly encompassed by the region is now the same territory as Savanes District.

References

Former regions of Ivory Coast
States and territories disestablished in 2011
2011 disestablishments in Ivory Coast
1997 establishments in Ivory Coast
States and territories established in 1997